Honeymoon Academy (also titled For Better or for Worse) is a 1989 American adventure comedy film directed by Gene Quintano, starring Robert Hays and Kim Cattrall.

Plot
During their honeymoon, a secret agent (Kim Cattrall) and her new husband (Robert Hays) become entangled in a plot to recover plates for counterfeiting US currency. She thinks that he is a newly retired government employee, while he thinks that she is a retired travel agent.

Cast
 Kim Cattrall as Chris
 Robert Hays as Sean
 Max Alexander as Sack
 Jonathan Banks as Pitt
 Gordon Jump as Mr. Nelson
 Lance Kinsey as Lance
 Jerry Lazarus as Marls
 Christopher Lee as Lazos
 Doris Roberts as Mrs. Nelson
 Charles Rocket as DeBains
 Leigh Taylor-Young as Mrs. Kent
 Judy Toll as Tina

Production
Originally named For Better or for Worse, the film is a romantic adventure caper, and has been called a low-budget attempt at the Romancing the Stone formula.

It was co-written and directed by Gene Quintano, author of several comedy and adventure films for Cannon, including Treasure of the Four Crowns (with this film's co-writer Jerry Lazarus) and the two Richard Chamberlain/Sharon Stone Allan Quatermain films. Quintano was coming off the third and fourth installments of the Police Academy series, and was joined by longtime franchise producer Paul Maslansky.  Argentina was considered as the main shooting location, before Spain was chosen. Additional scenes were filmed in Washington, DC. Photography took place between May and August 1988.

European-based American actor Tony Anthony, star and producer of the Spanish-shot Treasure of the Four Crowns, acted as producer on this film as well. Spanish production manager Francisco Bellot also returned. Another production partner was a subsidiary of Trans World Entertainment, whose boss Moshe Diamant would forge a long running association with Quintano.

Actors Paul Reiser and Jonathan Banks both suffered injuries during the shoot. In the case of Reiser, who was the original lead, he had to be hastily replaced by Robert Hays. The majority of the footage shot during Reiser's three-week tenure had to be reshot at a cost of $1 million.

In an effort to sell it as a Police Academy spinoff, the film was retitled Honeymoon Academy before release, despite being quite dissimilar in tone to the established series.

Release
The film was released on VHS in Sweden in December 1989 before its theatrical release in the United States on May 11, 1990.

References

External links
 
 
 

1989 films
1980s spy comedy-drama films
American spy comedy-drama films
1980s English-language films
Films shot in Spain
Films scored by Robert Folk
Films with screenplays by Gene Quintano
Films directed by Gene Quintano
1989 comedy-drama films
1989 drama films
Films produced by Paul Maslansky
1980s American films
1989 directorial debut films